Lycée Saint-Joseph of Avignon is a private Catholic secondary school located in the city of Avignon, Vaucluse, in the Provence-Alpes-Côte d'Azur, France. Founded in 1850 by the Society of Jesus, the school educates high-school students and post-baccalauréat students, in particular through a preparatory class for the grandes écoles.

Notable alumni 

 Isidore Méritan (1862-1928), politician and lawyer, deputy of Vaucluse

See also

 Catholic Church in France
 Education in France
 List of Jesuit schools

References

External links 
  Review of the organ of the chapel of the Lycée Saint Joseph

Jesuit secondary schools in France
1850 establishments in France
Educational institutions established in 1850
Schools in Provence-Alpes-Côte d'Azur
Education in Avignon